The Bosnia and Herzegovina men's national under-18 ice hockey team is the men's national under-18 ice hockey team of Bosnia and Herzegovina. The team is controlled by the Bosnia and Herzegovina Ice Hockey Federation, a member of the International Ice Hockey Federation. The team represents Bosnia and Herzegovina at the IIHF World U18 Championships.

International competitions

IIHF World U18 Championships

2003: 3rd in Division III Group B
2004: 7th in Division III
2005: 2nd in Division III Qualification

External links
Bosnia and Herzegovina at IIHF.com

National under-18 ice hockey teams
under